Mecury Kenny (born 28 November 1979) is a former Zimbabwean cricketer. An all-rounder, he is a right-arm off break bowler and a right-handed batsman. He played nine first-class matches for Matabeleland in the Logan Cup from 2001 to 2002.

References

External links
 
 

1979 births
Living people
Cricketers from Bulawayo
Matabeleland cricketers
Zimbabwean cricketers